Lino Bortolo Belotti  (19 October 1930 – 23 March 2018) was an Italian Roman Catholic prelate, former auxiliary bishop of the Diocese of Bergamo.

Biography
Born in Comenduno,  a frazione of Albino, he was ordained priest by Bishop Giuseppe Piazzi on 12 June 1954. Following his ordination he joined the Comunità Missionaria del Paradiso (Paradise Missionary Community), and later he worked as pastor for the Italian workers in Switzerland. After his return to Bergamo, he was named by Pope John Paul II as Auxiliary Bishop of that city's diocese.

He was the president of the commission dedicated to immigrants of the Italian Bishops' Conference, and president of the foundation Migrantes. He was also a member of the Pontifical Council for the Pastoral Care of Migrants and Itinerants. On 22 January 2009 Pope Benedict XVI accepted his resignation from the post of Auxiliary Bishop.

Notes 

1930 births
2018 deaths
People from Albino, Lombardy
20th-century Italian titular bishops